George Taylor (March 31, 1840 – March 26, 1919) was a Canadian politician.

Born in Lansdowne, Leeds County, Ontario, he was first elected to the House of Commons of Canada for the electoral district of Leeds South in the 1882 federal election. A Conservative, he would be re-elected 7 more times until being summoned to the Senate of Canada representing the senatorial division of Leeds, Ontario in 1911. He would sit in the Senate until his death in 1919 after having served in parliament for 37 years.

From 1891 to 1896, he was the Chief Government Whip and from 1901 to 1907 the Chief Opposition Whip.

References
 

1840 births
1919 deaths
Canadian senators from Ontario
Conservative Party of Canada (1867–1942) MPs
Conservative Party of Canada (1867–1942) senators
Members of the House of Commons of Canada from Ontario
People from Leeds and Grenville United Counties